A perlocutionary act (or perlocutionary effect) is the effect of an utterance on an interlocutor. Examples of perlocutionary acts include persuading, convincing, scaring, enlightening, inspiring, or otherwise affecting the interlocutor. The perlocutionary effect of an utterance is contrasted with the locutionary act, which is the act of producing the utterance, and with the illocutionary force, which does not depend on the utterance's effect on the interlocutor.

As an example, consider the following utterance: "By the way, I have a CD of Debussy; would you like to borrow it?" Its illocutionary function is an offer, while its intended perlocutionary effect might be to impress the interlocutor, or to show a friendly attitude, or to encourage an interest in a particular type of music. The actual perlocutionary effect can be different than the intended perlocutionary effect. In this example, the speaker may have intended to show a friendly attitude, but the listener might become irritated if they thought the speaker's intent was to impress them.

References

Linguistics
Pragmatics
Oral communication
Discourse analysis